Neil Smith is an American politician serving as a member of the Missouri House of Representatives from the 67th district. Elected in November 2020, he assumed office on January 6, 2021.

Early life and education 
Smith is a native of San Francisco. He earned a certificate in telecommunications cabling from John F. Kennedy University in Pleasant Hill, California.

Career 
Prior to entering politics, Smith spent 25 years in the auto industry. He moved to Missouri in 2005 and settled in St. Louis County. Smith was encouraged to run for the House by a friend, Jay Mosley. He was elected to the Missouri House of Representatives in November 2020 and assumed office on January 6, 2021.

References 

Living people
People from San Francisco
People from Fremont, California
People from St. Louis County, Missouri
People from St. Louis
Politicians from St. Louis
Politicians from St. Louis County, Missouri
Missouri Democrats
John F. Kennedy University alumni
Year of birth missing (living people)